Potamia may refer to the following places:

In Cyprus

Potamia, Cyprus (Turkish: Pattayam, Bodamya and Dereliköy), a village in the Nicosia district.

In Greece

Potamia, Achaea, a village in Achaea, part of the municipality Kalavryta
Potamia, Agia, a municipal unit in the Larissa regional unit, part of the municipality Agia
Potamia, Arcadia, a village in Arcadia, part of the municipality Megalopoli
Potamia, Elassona, a municipal unit in the Larissa regional unit, part of the municipality Elassona
Potamia, Evrytania, a municipal unit in Evrytania, part of the municipality Karpenisi
Potamia, Ioannina, a village in the Ioannina regional unit, part of the municipality Zagori
Potamia, Laconia, a village in Laconia, part of the municipality Sparti
Potamia, Naxos, a village in the island of Naxos in the Cyclades
Potamia, Thasos, a village in the island of Thasos
Potamia, Xanthi, a village in the Xanthi regional unit, part of Nea Kessani
Nea Potamia, a village in the island of Chios 
Skala Potamia, a village in the island of Thasos

In Italy 
 Potamia, a former town near San Luca, Calabria

In Turkey
Güneysu, a (formerly) Pontic Greek Muslim village in Rize Province, which retains its historical name Potamya in daily use by natives like president Erdogan.